Weight loss  is a reduction of the total body mass in an individual.

Weight loss may also refer to:
 "Weight Loss" (The Office), an episode of the American TV show The Office
 Weight Loss (novel), a novel by Upamanyu Chatterjee